China competed at the 2022 World Athletics Championships in Eugene, United States, from 15 to 24 July 2022.

Medallists

Results
China entered 46 athletes.

Men 
Track and road events

 Field events

Women 
Track and road events

 Field events

References

External links
Oregon22｜WCH 22｜World Athletics

Nations at the 2022 World Athletics Championships
World Championships in Athletics
2022